Pix the Cat is an independent video game designed and developed by Pastagames for Xbox One, PlayStation 4, Microsoft Windows, Linux, PlayStation Vita and Nintendo Switch. The game stars the cat Pix as he saves ducklings in a maze-like environment.

Gameplay
Pix the Cat is a mash-up of Snake and Pac-Man. Some levels are fast paced, where Pix must constantly collect ducklings without crashing its growing tail into an obstacle. Other levels only require a few items to be collected, but require more strategy.

Development
French developer Pastagames had worked with publishers for Rayman Jungle Run, Pix’n Love Rush and A.R. Rescue, but the team opted to release Pix the Cat independently. The game was in development for over three years.

Pix the Cat was made for PlayStation 4 and PlayStation Vita. Fabien Delpiano explained the team's goal to create a game where "sensations grow and intensify as your skill improves". Delpiano described the team's playtesting method for Pix, using a custom-built arcade cabinet in various locations including bars and game conventions. The game was released in October 2014.

Reception

Pix the Cat received generally favorable reviews from critics, with a score on review aggregator Metacritic of 80/100. Critics generally praised the game's retro gameplay and aesthetic. Writing for PlayStation Universe, John-Paul Jones called the game "a classic arcade puzzler with gameplay compounded by a tremendous amount of scope for mastery and blistering retro aesthetics". In a positive review for Eurogamer, Bruno Galvão found that the game could be enjoyed in both short sessions or several hours. Jeremy Peeples of Hardcore Gamer echoed this, complimenting the "surprising amount of depth" found throughout the game.

References

External links

 

2014 video games
Fictional cats
Focus Entertainment games
Indie video games
Maze games
PlayStation 4 games
PlayStation Vita games
Puzzle video games
Single-player video games
Snake video games
Video games developed in France
Windows games
Xbox One games
Neko Entertainment games
Nintendo Switch games
Video games about cats